Muñeca (English: Doll), is a Mexican telenovela directed by Fernando Wagner and produced by Manolo García for Televisa in 1973, starring Fanny Cano and Rodolfo Bebán.

Plot 
Daniel, a well-behaved child, is bored by his empty life. He lives with his aunt Amanda and uncle Alejandro since he was orphaned. One day, Alejandro tells Daniel that the inheritance he received from his parents is an area developed into a valuable and bustling city.

In that city lives Muñeca, a cute young girl who spends most of her time studying, Rat, who recently got out of jail; and Tobacco Kid, one of Rat's friends. Daniel arrives in the neighborhood wearing his old clothes and meets Muñeca. She thinks that he is one of the city's residents and Daniel played along. Using the name of Ángel he moved to live in the city with the help of Julita his faithful servant. Little by little Muñeca and Daniel  fall in love. A variety of complications make life difficult for Daniel, though. These include the truth of Daniel's identity coming out, Susana, a girl in love with Daniel, and uncle Alejandro whose true intentions are to stay in the land inherited by his nephew. Muñeca and Daniel will have to fight hard in order to be happy.

Cast 
 Fanny Cano† as Muñeca Rivas
 Rodolfo Bebán† as Daniel/Ángel
 Blanca Sánchez† as Laura
 Augusto Benedico† as Alejandro
 Andrea Palma† as Amanda
 Gustavo Rojo† as Padre Félix
 Alejandro Ciangherotti† as Anselmo
 Luis Miranda as El Rata
 Adalberto Martínez "Resortes"† as Sabino
 Virginia Manzano as María
 Susana Alexander as Márgara
 Manuel Rivera as José
 Guillermo Rivas "El Borras"† as Manzano
 Wolf Rubinsky† as Kid Tabaco
 Eduardo Pérez Rojas as Rodolfo
 Yolanda Liévana as Susana
 Alma Muriel† as Julita
 Enrique Álvarez Félix† as Mariano

References

External links 

Mexican telenovelas
1973 telenovelas
Televisa telenovelas
Spanish-language telenovelas